Caubvick (fl. 1773) was an Inuk from Labrador, a wife of one of George Cartwright's Inuit friends. The highest peak in all of Labrador and east of the Rockies is named in her honour, Mount Caubvick.

In 1773, George Cartwright took Attuiock and Tooklavina and their wives, including Caubvick, to England where they met with the king, members of the Royal Society and James Boswell The Inuit all developed smallpox while in England. Caubvick was the only survivor of the group. She returned to her native Labrador and passed on the dreaded disease to many of her people.

See also
 List of people of Newfoundland and Labrador

References

External links
Portrait of Caubvick

People from Labrador
Inuit from Newfoundland and Labrador